A bandolero was a Spanish robber. Bandolero may also refer to:

Film
The Bandolero, lost 1924 film  
Bandolero!, a 1968 movie starring James Stewart
Los Bandoleros (film), 2009 short film

Music
Bandolero (band), a French band formed by Jill Merme-Bourezak and, Carlos and José Perez, best known for the 1983 European hit "Paris Latino"
 Los Bandoleros (album), by Don Omar (2005)
"Bandolero" (song), a 1996 song by Paradisio
"Bandolero", 2005 song by Olga Tañón
"Bandoleros" (song), by Don Omar

Other
Bandoleros, cars in Bandolero racing, an entry-level racing formula in the United States

See also
Bandolier, a pocketed belt for holding ammunition